John Steel (24 October 1902 – 1976) was a Scottish professional footballer who played as a wing half for Hamilton Academical and Burnley. In 1923 he was a guest member of Third Lanark's squad which toured South America.

His wife Isa was the sister of George Sommerville, a teammate at Hamilton and Burnley.

References

Scottish footballers
Association football wing halves
Hamilton Academical F.C. players
Denny Hibernian F.C. players
Burnley F.C. players
Third Lanark A.C. players
Scottish Junior Football Association players
Scottish Football League players
English Football League players
Footballers from Falkirk (council area)
Date of death missing
1902 births
1976 deaths
People from Denny, Falkirk